Carex crassiflora is a tussock-forming perennial in the family Cyperaceae. It is native to parts of South America.

See also
 List of Carex species

References

crassiflora
Plants described in 1909
Taxa named by Georg Kükenthal
Flora of Bolivia
Flora of Argentina